Agincourt was launched at Monmouth in 1825, registered at Bristol, and became a West Indiaman sailing to Nevis. She was lost on 29 January 1829.

Agincourt first appeared in Lloyd's Register in 1826 with C. Claxton, master, Pinneys, owner, and trade Bristol–Nevis. Lloyd's Register for 1829 showed Agincourts master changing from William Scarth to Joseph Essex Harris.

Agincourt was on her way to Nevis when she ran on a reef at Antigua on 29 January 1829. Her cargo was lost but her crew was saved.

Citations and references
Citations

References
 

1825 ships
Ships built in Bristol
Age of Sail merchant ships of England
Maritime incidents in January 1829